The Jan Floreins Altarpiece or Triptych of Jan Floreins is a 1479 three-panel altarpiece, painted by Hans Memling for brother Jan Floreins of the Oud Sint-Janshospitaal in Bruges, where it still hangs as part of the collection of the Memlingmuseum.

Sources
 Irene Smets, Ludiongids Het Memlingmuseum-Sint-Janshospitaal Brugge, Ludion Gent-Amsterdam, 2001 pp. 46-51
  Stephan Kemperdick, Rogier van der Weyden, Könemann, Keulen, 1999 p. 131

1479 paintings
Memling
Paintings by Hans Memling
Paintings in the Old St. John's Hospital
Memling
Memling
Memling